The 1959 Giro di Lombardia was the 53rd edition of the Giro di Lombardia cycle race and was held on 18 October 1959. The race started and finished in Milan. The race was won by Rik Van Looy of the  team.

General classification

References

Giro di Lombardia
1959 in road cycling
1959 in Italian sport
October 1959 sports events in Europe